Elizabeth Shirley (1564 – 1 September 1641) was an English Augustinian nun and author. Born in England she died in Leuven at a convent she had helped create. She may have written the first biography of a woman, by a woman, in English.

Life
Shirley was born in 1564, probably in Leicestershire. She was one of eight children of Sir John Shirley. She went to live in Staunton Harold in Leicestershire to look after her unmarried brother. Her brother, Sir George Shirley, was a catholic and he tried to convert her to his religion. She resisted but she was persuaded by stories, books and her vision of the Holy Ghost.

Her brother married and she was no longer required at Staunton Harold. Her options included getting married or becoming a nun. She opted to become a nun although at the time the convents were abroad. She joined the Augustine cloister in Leuven known at St Ursula's and she professed on 10 September 1596. This was a Flemish cloister but it was led by Margaret Clement who was English and the house attracted many English women wanting to become nuns. Between 1569 and 1606, 28 women escaping recusancy in England had joined the house. In 1606 Margaret Clement retired and the new prioress was Flemish. A group of six nuns, unhappy that their candidate, Jane Wiseman's daughter, Mary Wiseman, had not been elected, decided to establish an English house. The house was established also in Leuven and it was named St Monica's. This was Shirley's creation as she had been elected to be the financial lead for the project. She led the new house when it was established on 10 February 1609 until nine months later. In the November another was elected as prioress and she took the role of sub-prioress.

In 1616 or 1626 she wrote what is now thought to be the first biography of a woman, by a woman in English. She chose to record the life of Margaret Clement who had led St Ursula's convent in Leuven.

Shirley resigned as sub prioress in 1637 and she died at St Monica's in Leuven and she was buried there.

References

1564 births
1641 deaths
17th-century English women writers
17th-century English writers
Augustinian nuns
English biographers
Women biographers
17th-century biographers